Kateřina Siniaková was the defending champion from the last time the tournament was held in 2017, but chose not to participate this year.

Misaki Doi won the title, defeating Danka Kovinić in the final, 6–4, 6–4.

Seeds

Draw

Finals

Top half

Bottom half

References

External Links
 Main draw

Swedish Open - Singles
2019 Women's Singles
2019 in Swedish women's sport